Deh-e Banan-e Bala (also Romanized as Deh-e Banān-e Bālā; also known as Bonān, Deh Banān, and Deh-e Banān) is a village in Dasht-e Khak Rural District, in the Central District of Zarand County, Kerman Province, Iran. At the 2006 census, its population was 107, in 30 families.

References 

Populated places in Zarand County